The Terrific Adventures of the Terrible Ten, more commonly known as The Adventures of the Terrible Ten, was an Australian children's TV show originally titled Ten Town that ran from 1959 to 1960. The series was filmed in rural Victoria. Fifty-two 10-minute episodes were created for the original series. The original episodes were re-edited and along with new footage were released in 1962 as The Ten Again. The series was originally screened on GTV-9; however, all repeats were aired by the Australian Broadcasting Corporation.

In 1965 a colour feature film adaptation of the series entitled Funny Things Happen Down Under was released; it was the film debut of Olivia Newton-John.

Episodes

References

External links
 

Nine Network original programming
Australian children's television series
Black-and-white Australian television shows
1959 Australian television series debuts
1960s Australian television series
English-language television shows